Dangerously Close is a 1986 action thriller film directed by Albert Pyun. The film was noted at its time of release for being part of a wave of teen vigilante films in the 1980s exploring the right-wing jingoism that was gaining popularity in the United States.

Plot
At an elite school, a group of students who call themselves The Sentinels begin terrorizing their socially undesirable classmates. Soon, one of their targets ends up brutally murdered. An editor of the high school paper begins to investigate and The Sentinels become even more ruthless in their behavior.

Cast
 John Stockwell as Randy McDevitt
 J. Eddie Peck as Donny Lennox
 Carey Lowell as Julie
 Bradford Bancroft as Krooger Raines
 Don Michael Paul as "Ripper"
 Thom Mathews as Brian Rigletti
 Gerard Christopher as Lang Bridges
 Madison Mason as Corrigan
 Anthony De Longis as Smith Raddock
 Carmen Argenziano as Molly
 Miguel A. Nunez Jr. as Leon Biggs
 Dedee Pfeiffer as Nikki
 Karen Lorre as Betsy
 Greg Finley as Morelli
 Debra Berger as Ms. Hoffman
 Angel Tompkins as Ms. Waters
 Rosalind Allen as Mrs. McDonald
 David Boyle as Mr. McDonald
 Eric Bartsch as Pete Bentley
 Joe Nipote as Steve
 Tony Kienitz as Paul
 Dru-Anne Perry as Barbie
 Paul Mitchell Rosenblum as Toby
 Kelly Chapman as Bobbi Page
 Rebecca Cruz as Vanessa 
 Dan Bradley as Bouncer
 Brian Maguire as Police Sergeant
 William Zimmerman as Policeman
 Tom Fridley as Student

Soundtrack
The film features music from The Smithereens, who sang the film's theme song, "Blood and Roses," Depeche Mode, Black Uhuru, Green on Red, TSOL, Lords of the New Church, Lost Pilots, and Michael McCarty.

Release
Dangerously Close received a wide release in North America on May 9, 1986 grossing $1,180,506 its first week, falling to $474,260 in its second week.

Reception
Roger Ebert's review was negative, suggesting that the director "devoted a great deal of time and thought to how his movie looked, and almost no time at all to what, or who, it was about." Gene Siskel gave the film zero stars out of four and wrote that it "surely does not contain any socially redeeming value ... That the editor of the school paper, supposedly the smartest kid in the class, also can't figure out what's going on is just another nail in the film's coffin." Nina Darnton of The New York Times wrote, "Shooting parts of the film like an MTV video, with flash forwards, odd camera angles and long shots and using a driving loud score, the director creates a completely adolescent world where adults either don't matter or exert malevolent influences ... But unfortunately, the adolescent world created within the film extends to its conception. Variety wrote that it "comes very close to being quite a good film. For its first two-thirds an engrossingly tense suspenser about teen vigilantes run amok, pic becomes distressingly conventional in its final act, its unusual qualities virtually dissolving before one's eyes." Patrick Goldstein of the Los Angeles Times was positive, stating, "It's clear that the film makers are playing with fire here, especially considering the jingoist atmosphere that pervades Hollywood today. But 'Dangerously Close' ... is more than just a stylish shocker. It captures the ugly side of a new teen-age obsession, forcing us to marvel at its ferocity and shudder at its possible consequences."

On Rotten Tomatoes the has an approval rating of 10%  based on reviews from 10 critics.

References

External links
 
 

1986 films
1986 action thriller films
American action thriller films
Films directed by Albert Pyun
Golan-Globus films
Teensploitation
1980s English-language films
1980s American films